The Atlantic Bridge is a road bridge in Colón, Panama spanning the Atlantic entrance to the Panama Canal. Completed in 2019, it is the third bridge over the canal after the Bridge of the Americas and the Centennial Bridge, both on the Pacific side of the canal.

The bridge was designed by the China Communication Construction Company and built by Vinci Construction.

Route
The bridge is part of a local connection road (as yet unnamed) between Bolivar Highway in the east and the undeveloped western area. It will replace the nearby Panama Canal Ferry. It is the only bridge north of the Culebra Cut (Puente Centenario).

Construction
Three consortiums were approved to bid for the bridge construction: Acciona Infraestructuras -Tradeco (Spain and Mexico), Odebrecht–Hyundai Joint Venture (Brazil and Korea), and Vinci Construction Grands Projets (France). Tenders were received in August 2012.

At that time the bridge had no name, but Third bridge and Atlantic side bridge were used, as well as Atlantic Bridge.

Construction of the bridge and access viaducts, which commenced in January 2013, was planned to take three and a half years and was expected to be completed in 2016.  The main span of the bridge was keyed (joined into a single span) on 6 September 2018. The bridge was unveiled by Panama President Laurentino Cortizo and Panama Canal Administrator Jorge Quijano on Friday 2 August 2019.

See also
List of bridges in Panama

References

External links

 Atlantic Bridge website  by Vinci SA
 Atlantic Bridge article  by China Communications Construction
 

Panama Canal
Colón, Panama
Bridges in Panama
Road bridges
Cable-stayed bridges in Panama
Girder bridges
Concrete bridges
Buildings and structures in Colón Province
Bridges completed in 2019
2019 establishments in Panama